Heliothis nubila is a species of moth of the family Noctuidae, described by George Hampson in 1903. It is found in Burkina Faso, the Gambia, Ghana, Guinea, Mauritania, Niger, Nigeria and Senegal.

References 

Heliothis
Moths of Africa
Moths described in 1903